Jane Cameron (born 29 November 1975) is an English actress, known for her roles as Sophie Wright in the ITV soap opera Emmerdale and as Ms. Templeman in the BBC children's show M.I.High. In 2011–12, she appeared on EastEnders as Sophie for four episodes.

Early and personal life
Cameron was born in Yorkshire. In 1998, she, her mother, and her stepfather were involved in a car accident. Her stepfather Steven Wood was driving the car with Jane and her mother inside, when it collided with Melanie Powell, 20, a friend of Jane's younger brother. The two cars crashed into a field near Menwith Hill, Harrogate, North Yorkshire at an unlit junction. All of the passengers in Wood's car survived, suffering minor bruises, but Powell, who worked in Bradford, and was driving home to see her boyfriend, died.

Career
 Throughout 1996 to 1997, Cameron appeared as nanny Sophie Wright in the ITV soap opera Emmerdale. Cameron got the role after a year out of drama school, "being thrust into a gruelling schedule in Emmerdale". She was initially auditioning for another part at Yorkshire Television, but got the Emmerdale role instead. Her father, David McDermott, was once a set designer on the show and was introduced as the nanny to James Tate. Cameron said that when she and her parents moved to America for six months when she was 16, she worked as nanny, calling it a "great experience". She said, "Until you've spent every day with a baby, you don't know what it's like. In one of the first scenes, which I read in the audition, someone said, 'Doesn't it make you want to have one of your own?' My character replied, 'No, absolutely not', it's a 24-hour-a-day job". Cameron spoke to a number of parents so she was prepared for the role of Sophie, wanting to be "professional", something which Cameron described Sophie as.

Cameron opined that she enjoyed having a baby on screen all the time, saying it is "like a prop", adding; "You can focus all your energies on the job in hand. But in other ways it can be hard, like when the baby cries. When he was a small baby, he slept most of the time, which is easier. When I got more used to things, the baby got more irritated. But his mother is always around and feels safe when she hands him over to me". The main storyline Cameron received was being paired with "lesbian vet" Zoe Tate (Leah Bracknell), until Cameron quit Emmerdale in 1997. Of her appearance in Band of Gold in 1996, she described her role as "brilliant" and "so well written".

Filmography
Television

Film

Radio

Stage

References

External links

English television actresses
English stage actresses
English soap opera actresses
Living people
Actresses from Yorkshire
1975 births